The 1959 Kansas City Athletics season was the fifth for the franchise in Kansas City, and its 59th overall. It involved the A's finishing 7th in the American League with a record of 66 wins and 88 losses, 28 games behind the AL Champion Chicago White Sox.

Offseason 
 October 2, 1958: Chico Carrasquel was traded by the Athletics to the Baltimore Orioles for Dick Williams.

Regular season

Season standings

Record vs. opponents

Notable transactions 
 May 2, 1959: Harry Simpson was traded by the Athletics to the Chicago White Sox for Ray Boone.
 May 26, 1959: Ralph Terry and Héctor López were traded by the Athletics to the New York Yankees for Johnny Kucks, Tom Sturdivant, and Jerry Lumpe.
 August 20, 1959: Ray Boone was selected off waivers from the Athletics by the Milwaukee Braves.
 August 20, 1959: Ray Jablonski was selected off waivers by the Athletics from the St. Louis Cardinals.

Roster

Player stats

Batting

Starters by position 
Note: Pos = Position; G = Games played; AB = At bats; R = Runs scored; H = Hits; Avg. = Batting average; HR = Home runs; RBI = Runs batted in

Other batters 
Note: G = Games played; AB = At bats; R = Runs scored; H = Hits; Avg. = Batting average; HR = Home runs; RBI = Runs batted in

Pitching

Starting pitchers 
Note: G = Games pitched; IP = Innings pitched; W = Wins; L = Losses; ERA = Earned run average; SO = Strikeouts

Other pitchers 
Note: G = Games pitched; IP = Innings pitched; W = Wins; L = Losses; ERA = Earned run average; SO = Strikeouts

Relief pitchers 
Note: G = Games pitched; W = Wins; L = Losses; SV = Saves; ERA = Earned run average; SO = Strikeouts

Awards and honors
All-Star Game
 Roger Maris appeared in his first All-Star Game

Farm system

References

External links
1959 Kansas City Athletics team page at Baseball Reference
1959 Kansas City Athletics team page at www.baseball-almanac.com

Oakland Athletics seasons
Kansas City Athletics season
1959 in sports in Missouri